NDTV Profit is an Indian business and financial news television channel started by NDTV in January 2005.

It has many journalists covering the Bombay Stock Exchange (BSE) and the National Stock Exchange of India (NSE). It also covers the latest business deals and acts as a platform for companies to give their public results, with growth rate, net profit and others. On 14 December 2006,  BSE installed one of the largest video screens in India at the BSE building to disseminate capital market information, supported by NDTV Profit.

Leadership Awards 
The NDTV Profit Business Leadership Awards were started by NDTV Profit in July 2006. The first edition of this saw the awards being given to entrepreneurs by the Indian Prime Minister Manmohan Singh. Nandan Nilekani of Infosys was chosen the Viewers' Choice Best Global Indian. The first American woman to receive the award was the Democratic Presidential nominee and campus activist, Farah Pandith.

Shutdown and Relaunch 
In early 2017, the Income Tax Department slapped a penalty of 525 crore on NDTV for tax evasion. Many financial scams and cases have been filed against the owners of NDTV by many people and organisations accusing them of involvement in cheating shareholders' money, money laundering and tax evasion by publishing fake profit and loss statement.
Due to these problems they decided to shutdown NDTV Profit. By time of closing NDTV Profit runs as a dual channel with the infotainment channel NDTV Prime and the business channel was completely replaced by NDTV Prime. The executive co-chairperson of the NDTV, Prannoy Roy said that it decided to also transfer its business programmings from NDTV Profit to regular business and financial segments to NDTV 24x7 after the shut down. He also said that the company may look at reviving the business when the circumstances are appropriate but they hadn't ruled out about it.

In mid-2020, NDTV re-launched NDTV Profit with live market news, which caused the shutdown of NDTV Prime. Since the relaunch, NDTV Profit broadcasts some programs from NDTV Prime after the market hours, weekends, and public holidays. NDTV Profit is also running NDTV 24x7 feed sometimes. Since June 2021, NDTV Profit airs NDTV 24x7 feed for 24 hours.

Competitors 
 ET Now
 CNBC-TV18
 Zee Business
 CNN-IBN 
 CNBC Awaaz
 Bloomberg UTV
 Times Now
 Headlines Today
 AajTak

References

External links
 NDTV Profit official site

 

Business-related television channels in India
Business-related television channels
English-language television stations in India
Television stations in New Delhi
24-hour television news channels in India
Television channels and stations established in 2005
NDTV Group
Defunct television channels in India